2018 Thai League 4 Western Region is the 6th season of the League competition since its establishment in 2013. It is in the 4th tier of the Thai football league system.

Changes from last season

Team changes

Promoted Clubs

Promoted from the 2017 Thailand Amateur League Central Region
 Chainat United

Promoted to the 2018 Thai League 3 Lower Region
 BTU United

Promoted to the 2018 Thai League 3 Upper Region
 Muangkan United

Relegated Clubs
Relegated from the 2017 Thai League 2
 Nakhon Pathom United
 Samut Songkhram

Relegated to the 2017 Thailand Amateur League Central Region
 Pathum Thani United

Withdrawn Clubs

Ratchaburi Mitr Phol B and Suphanburi B were taking a 1-year break.

Expansion Clubs
 Nakhon Pathom United and Samut Songkhram Club-licensing football club didn't pass to play 2018 Thai League 2. This team were relegated to 2018 Thai League 4 Western Region.

Reserving Clubs

 Chainat Hornbill U-23 is Chainat Hornbill Reserving this team which join Northern Region first time.

Teams

Stadium and locations

League table

Results by match played

Results 1st and 2nd match for each team

Results 3rd match for each team
In the third leg, the winner on head-to-head result of the first and the second leg will be home team. If head-to-head result are tie, must to find the home team from head-to-head goals different. If all of head-to-head still tie, must to find the home team from penalty kickoff on the end of each second leg match (This penalty kickoff don't bring to calculate points on league table, it's only the process to find the home team on third leg).

Season statistics

Top scorers
As of 25 August 2018.

Hat-tricks

Attendances

Attendances by home match played

Source: Thai League 4
Note: Some error of T4 official match report 28 April 2018 (IPE Samut Sakhon United 1–1 Nonthaburi).

See also
 2018 Thai League
 2018 Thai League 2
 2018 Thai League 3
 2018 Thai League 4
 2018 Thailand Amateur League
 2018 Thai FA Cup
 2018 Thai League Cup
 2018 Thailand Champions Cup

References

External links
Thai League 4
http://www.thailandsusu.com/webboard/index.php?topic=388919.0
https://web.archive.org/web/20180107103557/http://www.smmsport.com/news.php?category=74

4